Onuoha Ogbonna (born 14 August 1988) is a Nigerian football striker.

References

1988 births
Living people
Nigerian footballers
US Monastir (football) players
Riffa SC players
Khor Fakkan Sports Club players
Association football forwards
Tunisian Ligue Professionnelle 1 players
Nigerian expatriate footballers
Expatriate footballers in Tunisia
Nigerian expatriate sportspeople in Tunisia
Expatriate footballers in Bahrain
Nigerian expatriate sportspeople in Bahrain
Expatriate footballers in the United Arab Emirates
Nigerian expatriate sportspeople in the United Arab Emirates